Mervyn Langlois Wellington  (6 October 1940 – 7 September 2003) was a New Zealand politician of the National Party.

Early life and family
Wellington was born in Inglewood in 1940, and received his education at New Plymouth Boys' High School and the University of Auckland. He married Elizabeth Helen Bean in 1961 and the couple had three daughters. After a period as a social welfare worker between 1959 and 1961, Wellington became a school teacher and taught at St Stephen's School, Pukekohe High School and Ruapehu College. He was also a Methodist lay preacher and served as a Pukekohe borough councillor.

Member of Parliament

He represented the Manurewa electorate from 1975 to 1978, and then the Papakura electorate from 1978 to 1990, when he retired.

Wellington served as a Cabinet minister, being the Minister of Education from 13 December 1978 to 26 July 1984. During his tenure as Education Minister, he regularly courted controversy with teacher unions on various issues. Wellington was a Muldoon loyalist, and was demoted after National's 1984 election defeat.

Honours and awards
In 1977, Wellington was awarded the Queen Elizabeth II Silver Jubilee Medal, and in 1990 he received the New Zealand 1990 Commemoration Medal. In the 1993 Queen's Birthday Honours, he was appointed a Companion of the Queen's Service Order for public services.

Death
Wellington died in 2003, following a long illness.

References

 
 Hansard

1940 births
2003 deaths
New Zealand National Party MPs
Members of the Cabinet of New Zealand
New Zealand education ministers
Members of the New Zealand House of Representatives
New Zealand MPs for Auckland electorates
University of Auckland alumni
People educated at New Plymouth Boys' High School
Companions of the Queen's Service Order
People from Inglewood, New Zealand
20th-century New Zealand politicians